The 2020 Pittsburgh Riverhounds SC season was the club's twenty-first season of existence, their third season in the second tier of American soccer, and their tenth season in the league now named the USL Championship (USL-C).  This article covers the period from November 18, 2019, the day after the 2019 USL-C Playoff Final, to the conclusion of the 2020 USL-C Playoff Final, scheduled for November 12–16, 2020. Bob Lilley returns for his third season as Riverhounds manager.  On March 12, 2020 the Riverhounds announced their season would be suspended for 30 days as a result of the COVID-19 pandemic.

Roster

Competitions

Exhibitions

USL Championship

Standings — Group F

Match results

USL Cup Playoffs

U.S. Open Cup 

As a USL Championship club, the Riverhounds will enter the competition in the Second Round, to be played April 7–9.

References

Pittsburgh Riverhounds SC seasons
Pittsburgh Riverhounds SC
Pittsburgh Riverhounds SC
Pittsburgh Riverhounds SC